Derebaşalan is a village in the Suluova District, Amasya Province, Turkey. Its population is 199 (2021).

References

Villages in Suluova District